Aoshang is an urban town in Suxian District of Chenzhou, Hunan, China. It is surrounded by Chenjiang Subdistrict on the north, Zengfu Subdistrict on the west, Wugaishan Town and Bailutang Town on the east, and Liangtian Town on the south.

Administrative division
As of 2017, the town is divided into 10 villages and 2 communities.

Transportation
The town is connected to two highways: G4 Beijing–Hong Kong and Macau Expressway and G76 Xiamen–Chengdu Expressway.

The Beijing–Guangzhou railway serves the town. 

The South Chenjiang Road passes across the town.

Attractions
The main attractions are the Hunan-Guangzhou Ancient Road and the Ancient Residential Groups of Aoshang Village.

References

Towns of Chenzhou
Suxian District